Jalan Kuala Perlis, Federal Route 263, is a federal road in Kuala Perlis, Perlis, Malaysia. The Kilometre Zero is located at Persiaran Putra Timur junctions.

Federal Route 263 was built under the JKR R5 road standard, allowing a maximum speed limit of 90 km/h.

List of junctions and towns

References

Malaysian Federal Roads
Roads in Perlis